Alan Douglas Greene (15 April 1856 – 18 June 1928) was an English cricketer. He was educated at Clifton College, where he played cricket for the school, and Exeter College, Oxford, where he played for the University 1877–80, being captain in 1880. He played for Gloucestershire between 1876 and 1886.

References

1856 births
1928 deaths
English cricketers
Gloucestershire cricketers
People from Suffolk Coastal (district)
Oxford University cricketers
People educated at Clifton College
Alumni of Exeter College, Oxford
Old Oxonians cricketers